The Ford River is a  tributary of Lake Michigan on the Upper Peninsula of Michigan in the United States.

The Ford River was named for Thomas Ford, 8th Governor of Illinois.

See also
List of rivers of Michigan

References

Michigan  Streamflow Data from the USGS

Rivers of Michigan
Tributaries of Lake Michigan